Calliostoma barbouri is a species of sea snail, a marine gastropod mollusk in the family Calliostomatidae.

Distribution
This species occurs in the Caribbean Sea and the Gulf of Mexico.

Description 
The maximum recorded shell length is 25 mm.

Habitat 
Minimum recorded depth is 27 m. Maximum recorded depth is 192 m.

References

 Rosenberg, G., F. Moretzsohn, and E. F. García. 2009. Gastropoda (Mollusca) of the Gulf of Mexico, pp. 579–699 in Felder, D.L. and D.K. Camp (eds.), Gulf of Mexico–Origins, Waters, and Biota. Biodiversity. Texas A&M Press, College Station, Texas.

External links
 
 Calliostoma barbouri in Johnsonia v. 4 no. 40-48, 1960

barbouri
Gastropods described in 1946